Frank Joseph Jirka Jr., (July 27, 1922 – October 2, 2000) was elected as the President of the American Medical Association in 1983, before which he served as the President of the Illinois State Medical Society, President of the Chicago Medical Society and of the Douglas Park Branch of the Chicago Medical Society.

Born in Chicago as a grandson of Anton Cermak and nephew of Otto Kerner Jr., Jirka served as a lieutenant in the U.S. Navy during World War II. He was awarded the Silver Star and Purple Heart after being wounded in the Battle of Iwo Jima, due to which he had both legs amputated below the knee.

He graduated from Knox College in 1944 where he was a member of the Delta chapter of the Tau Kappa Epsilon fraternity. Jirka earned his medical degree from the University of Illinois at Urbana–Champaign. He settled in Barrington Hills, Illinois for the last twenty years of his life.

He died in his home on 2 October 2000.

References

1922 births
2000 deaths
Knox College (Illinois) alumni
Physicians from Chicago
People from Barrington Hills, Illinois
Military personnel from Illinois
United States Navy personnel of World War II
University of Illinois College of Medicine alumni
Recipients of the Silver Star
American people of Czech descent
American amputees
United States Navy officers
Presidents of the American Medical Association